Mthuli Ncube (born 30 November 1964), is the Finance Minister in the Zimbabwe cabinet appointed by president Emmerson Mnangagwa and past chief economist and Vice President of the African Development Bank. He holds a PhD in Mathematical Finance from Cambridge University. On 7 September 2018, President Emmerson Mnangagwa announced Zimbabwe's new cabinet where he named Professor Mthuli Ncube as the Finance Minister.

Academic career
Before joining the bank, he was dean and professor of finance at Wits Business School and then dean of the faculty of Commerce, Law and Management at the University of the Witwatersrand (Wits) as well as a lecturer in finance at the London School of Economics.

He has published a number of award-winning papers in the area of finance and economics as well as a number of books including, Mathematical Finance: Option and Asset Pricing; South African Dictionary of Finance (editor); Financial Systems and Monetary Policy in Africa; Development Dynamics: Theories and Lessons from Zimbabwe; and Monetary Policy and the Economy in South Africa (with Eliphas Ndou).

Ncube is currently a visiting professor at the University of Oxford.

Work at the African Development Bank
Ncube was the Chief Economist and Vice President of the African Development Bank (AfDB). As Chief Economist, he oversaw the Economics Complex, which is focused on the process of knowledge management within the Bank and with its partners, and general strategic economic research within the Bank. In this regard, he supervised the Development Research Department, Statistics Department and African Development Institute. As a Vice President, Professor Mthuli Ncube was a member of the senior management team of the Bank and contributed to its general strategic direction.

Other work
Ncube was also a regulator and a board member of the South African Financial Services Board (FSB), which regulates non-bank financial institutions in South Africa, founding  chairman of Barbican and Selwyn Capital and worked for Investec Asset Management as a Portfolio Manager and Head of Asset Allocation Strategy.

Ncube has also been Chairman of the Board of the African Economic Research Consortium, chairman of the Global Agenda Council on "Poverty and Economic Development" (World Economic Forum) and a governor of the African Capacity Building Foundation.

Finance Minister
Ncube was appointed Finance Minister of Zimbabwe on Friday 7 September 2018 under President Emmerson Mnangagwa's government.  In 2019, he presided over the conversion from foreign currency to a new Zimbabwean currency, and the resultant return of hyper-inflation.  Ncube suspended publishing inflation data after June 2019, and in October 2019 he indicated inflation figures for Zimbabwe would again be released in February 2020.

Personal life
Ncube is married and has four children or more.

Notes and references

External links
Profile at the African Development Bank

21st-century South African economists
Finance Ministers of Zimbabwe
Academic staff of the University of the Witwatersrand
Alumni of the University of Cambridge
20th-century South African economists
1963 births
Living people